Pinguicula poldinii is a species of insectivorous plant endemic to Val d'Arzino, Italy, where it grows at elevations of 450–550 meters. It is restricted to steep rocks (in a habitat created mainly as a result of disturbance in a construction site) throughout a very small area in which it is threatened by over-collection. It was described in 2001.

References 

Carnivorous plants of Europe
poldinii